The 2nd constituency of Val-de-Marne is a French legislative constituency in the Val-de-Marne département.

Description

The 2nd constituency of Val-de-Marne runs as a band of territory from the southern edge of the department into centre and the town of Créteil. It includes the town of Orly famed for the airport which adjoins it.

This strongly working class seat elected Laurent Cathala of the PS at every election between 1988 and 2017.

Historic Representation

Election results

2022

 
 
 
 
 
 
 
|-
| colspan="8" bgcolor="#E9E9E9"|
|-

2017

 
 
 
 
 
 
 
 
|-
| colspan="8" bgcolor="#E9E9E9"|
|-

2012

 
 
 
 
 
|-
| colspan="8" bgcolor="#E9E9E9"|
|-

2007

 
 
 
 
 
 
 
|-
| colspan="8" bgcolor="#E9E9E9"|
|-

2002

 
 
 
 
 
 
 
|-
| colspan="8" bgcolor="#E9E9E9"|
|-

1997

 
 
 
 
 
 
 
|-
| colspan="8" bgcolor="#E9E9E9"|
|-

Sources
Official results of French elections from 2002: "Résultats électoraux officiels en France" (in French).

2